Kig ha farz is a cooked dish consisting of various meats simmered in a broth with a buckwheat flour based pudding. It is eaten traditionally in Brittany, more specifically around Léon in the region situated west from Morlaix to Brest. This dish, which is quite similar to a pot-au-feu, was once considered a dish for the poor and peasantry.  The name in Breton literally means "meat and stuffing".

A cooking broth contains meats such as salted pork knuckles and beef along with vegetables such as carrots and cabbage. These ingredients are simmered together with a cylindrical cloth bag filled with a mixture of eggs, milk, and buckwheat flour (known locally as "black wheat") for several hours. The cloth sac containing the cooked buckwheat pudding (farz) is usually rolled and the contents broken-up before serving. The dish is presented with the cooked meats and vegetables and the farz is consumed with a sauce locally known as "lipig", made with melted butter, bacon, and shallots.

A variation of the buckwheat farz is  the "white" farz (far gwinizh) made using wheat flour, and preferred by children due to its light and sweet flavour. The white wheat based farz is also eaten in slices pan-fried with butter (farz fritet).

History 
Although numerous palynological traces are attested for the ancient and medieval era, buckwheat or buckwheat, originating in Asia, appears in Breton and Norman texts from the end of the 15th century. It will quickly impose itself in the poor lands of inland Brittany. Its rapid growth (four months) and high yield ensure its success. It replaces wheat for food and becomes the basic cereal in Bas-Léon, "the part of Brittany where Breton is spoken, lives on buckwheat flour pancakes" wrote Stendhal. This allowed the marketing of wheat and ensured a certain prosperity in Brittany. By providing the population with a correct diet, buckwheat was probably no stranger to the population growth in Brittany in the 19th century.

Until the Revolution, the obligation to use communal ovens and to pay taxes restricted this method of cooking, far in a bag, thus remaining the only type of fars until the 19th century. As early as 1732, Grégoire de Rostrenen, in his dictionary, defined the word fars as "farce cooked in a bag in the pot to eat with meat in the manner of Léon". In all the houses of the country of Léon, one found bags to make far (their realization in finely sewn linen, the seams on the outside, were in the program of the domestic course of Saint-Pol-de-Léon, before marry). In some parts of Cornwall it is called farz poch or farz mañch, a far cooked in a pocket or an old shirt sleeve. Sack cooking is more common on islands or in poor, deforested areas. Claude Grassineau-Alasseur once wrote in the book Briérons: "In Brière, we often ate grou, the equivalent of Breton kig ha farz; to the vegetables of the pot-au-feu we add a piece of bacon and a porridge of buckwheat which we put in a small canvas bag; when cooked, this porridge forms a mass and can be cut into slices». This type of mixture cooked inside an envelope is known in other French regions (farcis du Poitou, farcidure du Limousin, farcement de Savoie (farçon à la tasque)12) and in Europe (broeder, Jan-in -de-zak in the Netherlands).

In the middle of the 19th century, the vegetable boom in the agricultural economy, thanks to marine amendments, gave far en sac its current form. The farz sac'h, cooked on its own or with bacon, is used to feed the agricultural workers, in particular the day laborers whom the peasant will hire every morning in the square of Saint-Pol-de-Léon and who are called plasennerien, those space. The vegetables used for the Sunday kig ha farz (very often cooked during mass) come from the courtil, the liorzh, the garden near the house. The Sunday lunch included a fatty soup ("an drusañ, ar gwellañ", the fatter, the better), meat (shank and exceptionally beef) and far. The leftovers made it possible to make several other meals: the broth was used to dip bread soup or make flour soups, the sliced ​​far was returned in the fat or better in the butter (farz fritet). We served the exceptional kig-ha-farz with lipig, a sauce prepared with Roscoff pink onions melted in butter. This Breton word is associated with the pleasure of eating and eating fat: someone who was greedy was described as a fat mouth, "beg lipous" or a paw-licker, "lip e baw", which also designates a cake in cape Sizun.

This "national" Léonard dish allows the Léonard population to gather together often, a convivial means of financing activities; in 1982, the kig ha farz of Plouescat brought together more than a thousand guests. It is in Léon that this culinary tradition remains most alive, although since the 1970s, kig ha farz has tended to spread beyond its original Léonard region. It was the Breton associations, particularly in Paris (cf. the Ti Jos creperie-restaurant in Montparnasse) and in the big cities, which popularized a name and a recipe that had hitherto been family-run and local.

See also

 List of stews

References

External links
Kig Ha Farz: Breton buckwheat dumpling recipe

Breton cuisine
French stews
Buckwheat dishes